David Dilley Bannon (born David Wayne Dilley; April 22, 1963) is an American author and translator, best known for the books Elements of Subtitles and Wounded in Spirit. He translates from Korean-to-English and German-to-English, notably the works of Friedrich Rückert. Bannon was born in Washington State in the United States. The son of photographer Dennis Dilley, he left home at age 19, spending many years in Asia. He taught college for two decades and was curator of Asian art for the Florence Museum of Art and History in South Carolina, USA. Bannon has appeared on The Discovery Channel (1997), Ancient Mysteries (1997), In Search of History (1999), On the Inside (2001), TechTV (2003) and History's Mysteries (2006). He has been interviewed by NPR, Fox News and The Wall Street Journal. He has translated subtitles for 44 South Korean television shows, including East of Eden (2008), The Great Queen Seondeok (2009), Dong Yi (2010), The Greatest Love (2011), Soldier (2012), Lights and Shadows (2011), Nine-tailed Fox (2013) and Mystery Television (2019). In 2006, Bannon was convicted on charges of criminal impersonation. He was sentenced to five years, serving three prior to his release. Married twice, he lost his only child, Jessica Autumn Bannon, to a fentanyl-laced heroin overdose in 2015. Bannon publishes on grief, art, history, culture, and translation, as well as delivering lectures at libraries, museums and conferences.

Career

Bannon writes and speaks on art, history, culture, computer technology, business and translation. He has appeared on A&E, The Discovery Channel and The History Channel and in The Wall Street Journal.

Bannon held a two-year appointment as curator of Asian art (1992-1994) for the Florence Museum of Art and History in South Carolina, now known as the Florence County Museum.

Bannon translated Korean-to-English subtitles for YA Entertainment and the Munhwa Broadcasting Corporation. His original Korean-language poems and translations of Korean poetry and spirituality texts have appeared in consumer magazines, trade publications and academic journals.  He has published two collections of the writings of Korean Zen master Bopjong.

Personal life

Bannon was born in Tacoma, Washington, and grew up in Spokane Valley, Washington. Married twice, he had one child, Jessica Autumn Bannon (November 29, 1988 – January 16, 2015). She died of a fentanyl-laced heroin overdose. After his daughter's death, Bannon and his wife established The Jessica Autumn Bannon Memorial Film Collection on September 26, 2015, with 1,500 film and television titles. In 2017 the collection consisted of 2,000 titles. The bulk of the collection is housed in the Chester County Library in Chester, South Carolina.

Bannon was arrested in Boulder, Colorado, on January 27, 2006, on the charges of criminal impersonation, computer crime, and attempted theft. The charges leveled against him asserted that he created a fraudulent personal history. On April 24, 2006, Bannon pleaded guilty to the charge of criminal impersonation before a Colorado judge. His guilty plea was made in exchange for prosecutors dropping the additional charges of computer crime and attempted theft. Bannon was sentenced to five years, serving three prior to his release in June, 2009.

His daughter, Jessica Autumn Bannon, died on January 16, 2015.

Bibliography
 Introduction to Windows 95/98 (Prentice Hall, 2000)
 Internet & World Wide Web: How To Program Second Edition (contributing editor; Prentice Hall; 2000), 
 e-Business & e-Commerce: How To Program (contributing editor; Prentice Hall; 2001)
 Race Against Evil: The Secret Missions of the Interpol Agent Who Tracked the World's Most Sinister Criminals A Real-life Drama (New Horizon Press; 2006), 
 Korean-English/English-Korean Standard Dictionary (Hippocrene Standard Dictionary) (Hippocrene Books, 2009), editor; 
 The Elements of Subtitles: A Practical Guide to the Art of Dialogue, Character, Context, Tone and Style in Subtitling (2010), Third edition, 2013; 
 Meditations of a Zen Master (editor and translator; Bilingual Library, 2012), 
 Meditations of a Korean Monk (editor and translator; Bilingual Library, 2012), 
 Between Fighting Men: Nostalgia and B-Westerns (2013), published in conjunction with the Chester Library film, exhibit and lecture series 
 Darker Than Anywhere: Korean War Reminiscences, (editor; Bilingual Library, 2015); 
 Wounded in Spirit: Advent Art and Meditations, foreword by Philip Yancey (Paraclete Press, 2018); 
 Songs on the Death of Children: Selected Poems from Kindertotenlieder, foreword by Cornelia Kallisch (McFarland & Company, 2022);

References

External links
 Press release by the US Department of Justice on Bannon's arrest
 David Bannon on IMDb

1963 births
Living people
American confidence tricksters
Impostors
American translators
American male writers
20th-century male writers
20th-century translators